James Hall is an English rugby union player born 1986, Stoke-on-Trent, England. He formerly played for Bristol Rugby in the Aviva Premiership.

Playing career
Waterloo R.F.C 2006-2009
Coventry R.F.C. 2009-2010
Newcastle Falcons 2010-2013
Bristol Rugby 2013-17

Honours
England Students 2009

References
 Hall Receives England call-up
 Newcastle Falcons have signed Coventry prop James Hall following the departure of tight head Carl Hayman to French side Toulon.
 Statbunker page
 

1986 births
Living people
Coventry R.F.C. players
English rugby union players
Newcastle Falcons players
Rugby union players from Stoke-on-Trent
Waterloo R.F.C. players
Rugby union props